is a beat 'em up video game developed and published by SNK that was released for Neo Geo arcades and home consoles in 1991 and the Neo Geo CD in 1995.

Gameplay 

There is no character selection in  Robo Army : Player 1 controls Maxima and Player 2 controls Rocky. Both cyborgs must cross six levels before reaching the end boss. During these levels, they will face the Professor's henchmen, as well as a sub-boss and a boss in each stage. The two heroes can of course fight with their fists and feet, but they can also defend themselves by collecting improvised weapons (car carcass, barrel, destroyed robot arm). They each have a power gauge allowing them to launch powerful attacks according to the power gained. Maxima and Rocky can also be transformed for a brief moment into an invulnerable armored vehicle.

Development and release

Reception 

In Japan, Game Machine listed Robo Army on their December 15, 1991 issue as being the twenty-third most-successful table arcade unit of the month, outperforming titles such as Columns. The game received mixed reception from both critics and reviewers alike since its initial release in arcades and Neo Geo AES.

In 2014, HobbyConsolas identified Robo Army as one of the twenty best games for the Neo Geo CD.

Notes

References

External links 
 Robo Army at GameFAQs
 Robo Army at Giant Bomb
 Robo Army at Killer List of Videogames
 Robo Army at MobyGames

1991 video games
ACA Neo Geo games
Arcade video games
SNK beat 'em ups
Multiplayer and single-player video games
Neo Geo games
Neo Geo CD games
Nintendo Switch games
PlayStation Network games
PlayStation 4 games
Science fiction video games
Video games set in the future
Windows games
Xbox One games
Video games developed in Japan
Hamster Corporation games